The Capt. C.C. Ferrill House is a historic house in Quitman, Mississippi. It was built in 1900 for Captain C. C. Ferrill, who served as the clerk of Clarke County's chancery court. It was acquired by the Kirkland family in 1910.

The house was designed in the Queen Anne architectural style. It has been listed on the National Register of Historic Places since May 20, 1994.

References

National Register of Historic Places in Clarke County, Mississippi
Queen Anne architecture in Mississippi
Houses completed in 1900